Agus Susanto (formerly known as  Tjoe Tjong Boon 蔡宗滿) born 1940, He is a former Indonesian badminton player in the 60s

Career

Agus Susanto started his career as a badminton player at the Badminton at the 1966 Asian Games in Bangkok Thailand. At the event, he successfully brought two silver medals in the men's doubles paired with Ang Tjin Siang  and bronze in the mixed doubles paired with Retno Kustijah.  Agus' success at the Asian Games led him to be selected for the Indonesian men's team at the 1967 Thomas Cup in Jakarta.

Achievements

Asian Games 

Men's doubles

Mixed doubles

References

Indonesian male badminton players
Asian Games medalists in badminton
Badminton players at the 1966 Asian Games
Asian Games silver medalists for Indonesia
Asian Games bronze medalists for Indonesia
Medalists at the 1966 Asian Games
1940 births
Living people
20th-century Indonesian people
21st-century Indonesian people